Laurence Echard (c. 1670–1730) was an English historian and clergyman. He wrote a History of England that was a standard work in its time.

Life
Echard was the son of the Rev. Thomas Echard or Eachard of Barsham, Suffolk, by his wife, the daughter of Samuel and Dorothy Groome, and was born at Barsham. On 26 May 1687, at the age of 17, he was admitted as a sizar of Christ's College, Cambridge, where he graduated B.A. in 1692 and M.A. in 1695. Having been ordained by John Moore, bishop of Norwich, he was presented to the livings of Welton and Elkington, Lincolnshire, and appointed chaplain to the Bishop of Lincoln.

For more than 20 years Echard remained in Lincolnshire, chiefly at Louth, and wrote several works. On 24 April 1697 he was installed as prebendary of Louth at Lincoln Cathedral, and on 12 August 1712 as Archdeacon of Stow. In or about 1722 Echard was presented by George I with the livings of Rendlesham and Sudbourne in Suffolk. There he lived in bad health for nearly eight years. He died at Lincoln, while on his way to Scarborough for the benefit of the waters, on 16 August 1730, and was buried in the chancel of St Mary Magdalen's Church on the 29th of that month.

Works

Echard translated Terence, some Plautus, and Pierre Joseph d'Orléans' History of the Revolutions in England. He made numerous compilations on history, geography and the classics. His chief work is The History of England: from the first entrance of Julius Caesar and the Romans to the end of the reign of King James the first containing the space of 1678 years (1707–1720), covering the period from the Roman occupation to his own times. This continued to be the standard work on the subject until Nicolas Tindal's translations and expansions of Rapin de Thoyras's French Histoire d'Angleterre ("History of England") began to appear in English in 1727. Echard also wrote a history of the Roman republic from its founding to the Augustan settlement

Family
Echard married first Jane, daughter of the Rev. Potter of Yorkshire, and secondly Justin, daughter of Robert Wooley of Well, Lincolnshire. There were no children by either marriage.

Notes

References
Attribution

External links

1670 births
1730 deaths
Archdeacons of Stow
People from Waveney District
British historians
People from Louth, Lincolnshire